Gary Miller (29 February 1960 – 5 May 2022) was an English record producer, songwriter, arranger and multi-instrumentalist. In his early years, Miller worked for the London production house Stock Aitken Waterman as staff producer, mixer, and songwriter, and was later part of the Metrophonic team. While at Stock Aitken Waterman and Metrophonic, he worked on songs for Donna Summer, Lionel Richie, Kylie Minogue, Bananarama, and Simply Red, and was one of the producers of the David Bowie song "Everyone Says 'Hi'", which was released in 2002 on the album Heathen.

Miller started his music career during the 1980s as a guitarist, touring with Nik Kershaw's backing band The Krew. In 1988, Miller was musical director for Deon Estus, who was the opening act for several shows on George Michael's The Faith Tour.

Miller moved to Malibu, California, in 2006, where he started working as an independent producer on songs for various artists, including three unreleased remixes of Katy Perry songs. In Malibu, Miller started the Rock Against Trafficking foundation to raise money and awareness to fight human trafficking. The mostly unreleased Rock Against Trafficking (RAT) album project, which was produced by Miller in 2014, is called Set Them Free, and features The Police and Sting covers performed by various well-known artists, such as members of the rock band Journey, Heart, Carlos Santana, Slash, Julian Lennon, Ellis Hall, and En Vogue. The RAT flagship song "Stand Up" is an original, co-written by Miller with artist AV!VA, and performed by AV!VA.  "Roxanne", the first single from the Set Them Free album, which was performed by Glenn Hughes of Deep Purple, has been released on 11 January 2018.

Miller died on 5 May 2022 at the age of 62 in his home in Southern California.

Partial production discography

References

1960 births
2022 deaths
Musicians from Yorkshire
English male guitarists
People from Kingston upon Hull
People from Malibu, California
English record producers
English songwriters
English pop musicians
British nonprofit executives
English expatriates in the United States